James Joseph Mattern (March 8, 1905 – December 17, 1988) was an American aviator. Mattern undertook a number of aviation world records, including twice attempting to break the world record for aerial circumnavigation set by Wiley Post and Harold Gatty. Both attempts failed; the second in 1933 resulted in a crash landing and subsequent rescue by Eskimos and Sigizmund Levanevsky in Siberia. In a twist of fate, Mattern would join the search for Levanevsky after he went missing in 1937. Levanevsky was never found.

In 1928, Mattern sold an air plane to an oil company in Texas owned by Michael Benedum. Benedum would later become a frequent financial backer of Mattern's flying activities. In 1937, Mattern was hired as the aeronautical director for the Benedum and Tree's oil company.

Starting in 1938, Mattern was a Lockheed test pilot on the P-38 Lightning and during the war helped develop the 'Piggyback' two-seat version that significantly reduced training accidents. In 1946 he was diagnosed at the Mayo Clinic with a ruptured blood vessel in his brain (perhaps due to repeated excessive G-forces experienced while demonstrating P-38s) and was unable to fly again because of the condition. After losing his ability to fly, Mattern and his wife became real estate brokers and then operated a travel agency. He also supported the space program, attended three Apollo launches and had his pilot's license carried to the moon aboard Apollo 11. He also marketed aviation calculators known as the Mattern computer, a course and mileage slide rule, in the late 1940s.

Personal life
James Mattern was born March 8, 1905, in Freeport, Illinois, to Phillip and Caroline (née Kennedy) Mattern. He also had two older brothers and an older sister. Mattern married Della M. in Los Angeles in 1927. He requested a divorce in Chicago, Illinois, in 1937, stating that Della had left him in 1932 and was living in Washington. On May 18, 1937, the day after his divorce was finalized, Mattern was married to Dorothy J. Harvey, a showgirl, at Berwyn Methodist Church. He remained married to Dorothy until his death in 1988. Dorothy died in January 2002.

Aerial circumnavigation record attempts
July 5, 1932: Mattern and Bennett Griffin flew "The Century of Progress", a Lockheed Vega, powered by a Pratt & Whitney Wasp engine, from Floyd Bennett Field, New York, to Harbor Grace, Newfoundland, and then non-stop to Berlin, Germany, in 18:41 hours. This failed round-the-world flight attempt ended in an emergency crash landing at Borisov, Belarus, USSR, on July 7, 1932. They did, however, set a record for crossing the Atlantic Ocean: 10 hours, 50 minutes.

June 3, 1933: Mattern flew a rebuilt "Century of Progress", largely a different aircraft, and this time solo, from Floyd Bennett Field across the Atlantic. On June 14, 1933, he made a forced landing in Siberia, where the "Century" was abandoned. He was eventually rescued by Eskimos and flown to Nome, Alaska, by Sigizmund Levanevsky. Mattern flew the rest of the way back to New York.

Honors
1973 National Aeronautic Association Wesley L. McDonald Elder Statesman Award
1981, Oklahoma Air and Space Hall of Fame
Honorary fellow of the Society of Experimental Test Pilots

Bibliography
Cloud country Mattern, Jimmie. The Pure oil company. Chicago. 1936. (OCoLC)1369439. ASIN: B001PM7GYU.

References

External links

The Early Birds of Aviation, Inc. - Mattern
 Lockheed Vega "Century of Progress", after landing in Russia 1932(archived)

1905 births
1988 deaths
American test pilots
Aviators from Illinois
People from Freeport, Illinois
Lockheed people